Chigua is a genus of cycads in the family Zamiaceae containing two species, endemic to small areas in northwestern Colombia. Described by botanist Dennis Stevenson in 1990, it is the most recently named genus, and the name refers to a Spanish transliteration of the common name given to cycads by the indigenous peoples of Colombia. The species are found in wet lowland rainforests at 100–200 m altitude.

Both species are listed as Critically Endangered by the IUCN Red List. The whole genus is listed under CITES Appendix I / EU Annex A, and CITES prohibits international trade in specimens of these species except when the purpose of the import is not commercial, for instance for scientific research.

Plants have a subterranean globose stem. The leaves emerge singly and are straight, oblong, and pinnately compound. The petiole and rachis have spines. leaflets are opposite, lanceolate, and jointed at the base. They have a toothed margin with a distinct midrib and forking parallel side veins. Male cones are cylindrical and covered in short hairs. They are held on long erect stalks and have hexagonal sporophylls. Female cones are broadly cylindrical and hairy, held on very long peduncles two to three times the length of the cone. The female sporophylls are also hexagonal and have distinct bumps. The elliptical seeds are pink or red in color.

Chigua is very closely related to the genus Zamia. Chigua restrepoi was collected as early as 1918 by Francis Pennell, but the new species was placed in Zamia. It was not collected again until 1986, and two subsequent collections in 1987 and 1988 became the basis for the establishment of a new genus. Because the genus has only been collected four times, there is little known about its conservation problems. The population sizes for the species are unknown, and nothing is known about the cones or seeds of Chigua bernalii, which is only known from the 1986 collection. Because political conflict in Colombia has made travelling dangerous there, the genus is unlikely to be well known for a while. Cattle grazing, mining, and oil exploration have threatened the habitat in the region.

References

Jones, David L. Cycads of the World: Ancient Plants in Today's Landscape. Washington, D.C.: Smithsonian Institution Press, 2002. .
Chigua in The Cycad Pages
Horticultural Consultants, Inc. – Chigua

Zamiaceae
Endemic flora of Colombia